The 2018–19 All-Ireland Intermediate Club Football Championship was the 16th staging of the All-Ireland Intermediate Club Football Championship since its establishment by the Gaelic Athletic Association for the 2003–04 season.

The All-Ireland final was played on 9 February 2019 at Croke Park in Dublin, between Kilcummin and Naomh Éanna. Kilcummin won the match by 5-13 to 2-09 to claim their first ever championship title.

All-Ireland Intermediate Club Football Championship

All-Ireland semi-finals

All-Ireland final

References

2018 in Irish sport
2019 in Irish sport
All-Ireland Intermediate Club Football Championship
All-Ireland Intermediate Club Football Championship